The Swedish Golf Tour Final, currently known as the MoreGolf Mastercard Tour Final for sponsorship reason, is a golf tournament played as the season-ending championship of the Swedish Golf Tour. 

The Tour Final was introduced in the 2005 season, succeeding the Telia Grand Prix, a Challenge Tour event that had served as the season ending event for most years since 1996. The Swedish Golf Tour (women) had played the Telia Ladies Finale since 1997. Both were discontinued around the time tour sponsorship passed from Telia to Scandinavian Airlines and it became the SAS Masters Tour. After Nordea took over the sponsorship in 2011, the Tour Championship was reintroduced.

Winners

Notes

References

External links
MoreGolf Mastercard Tour

Swedish Golf Tour events
Golf tournaments in Sweden
2005 establishments in Sweden